The 2016–17 Essex Senior Football League season was the 46th in the history of Essex Senior Football League, a football competition in England.

League table

The league featured 19 clubs which competed in the league last season, along with three new clubs.
Clubs relegated from the Isthmian League:
Barkingside
Redbridge
Plus:
West Essex, promoted from the Middlesex County League

Also, Greenhouse Sports changed name to Haringey & Waltham.

League table

Promotion criteria
To be promoted at the end of the season a team must:	
 Have applied to be considered for promotion by end November	
 Pass a ground grading examination by end March	
 Finish the season in a position higher than that of any other team also achieving criteria 1 and 2	
 Finish the season in one of the top three positions

The following five teams achieved criterion one:
 Barking
 Clapton
 FC Romania
 Ilford
 Waltham Forest

References

Essex Senior Football League seasons
9